Lorentz Mortensen Angell (9 March 1626 – 30 July 1697) was a merchant and landowner in Norway.

He was born at Angeln east of Flensburg in Southern Schleswig.   Around 1650, he settled in Trondheim when many merchants and traders from Flensburg were taking  part in the fishing trade along the Norwegian coast. He built up a considerable fortune as a merchant and ship owner. He was co-owner of Røros Copper Works and significant landowner with numerous farms in Nordland  including Tjøtta estate (Tjøttagodset) on the island Tjøtta in Alstahaug.

Personal life
Angell was married three time. In 1653, he married Margrethe Hansdatter Puls (1631- 1670). She died in 1670 after giving birth to six sons, five of whom survived to adulthood. In 1671, he married  Abel Jespersdatter (1651-1683). She died in 1683 after giving birth to ten children, six of whom survived to adulthood. In 1684, he married Margrethe Pedersdatter who died in 1713. She bore him a daughter. He was the father of Hans Angell  (1658-1728) and Albert Angell (1660-1705). He was the grandfather of Thomas Angell.

See also
Angell (family)

References

1626 births
1697 deaths
People from Flensburg
Norwegian landowners
Norwegian merchants
German emigrants to Norway
17th-century Norwegian businesspeople